Sarah Virginia Wade  (born 10 July 1945) is a British former professional tennis player. She won three Major tennis singles championships and four major doubles championships, and is the only British woman in history to have won titles at all four majors. She was ranked as high as No. 2 in the world in singles, and No. 1 in the world in doubles.

Wade was the most recent British tennis player to win a major singles tournament until Andy Murray won the 2012 US Open, and was the most recent British woman to have won a major singles title until Emma Raducanu won the 2021 US Open. After retiring from competitive tennis, she coached for four years, and has also worked as a tennis commentator and game analyst for the BBC and Eurosport and CBS in the U.S.

Early life
Wade was born in Bournemouth, England, UK, on 10 July 1945. Her father was the archdeacon of Durban.

At one year old, Wade moved to South Africa with her parents. There, she learned how to play tennis. When she was fifteen, the family moved back to England and she went to Tunbridge Wells Girls' Grammar School and Talbot Heath School, Bournemouth. In 1961, she was in the tennis team of Wimbledon County Girls' Grammar School. She went on to study mathematics and physics at the University of Sussex, graduating in 1966.

Tennis career

Wade's tennis career spanned the end of the amateur era and the start of the open era. In 1968, as an amateur, she won the inaugural open tennis competition – the British Hard Court Open at Bournemouth. She turned down the £300 first prize, choosing to play for expenses only. Five months later, after turning professional, she won the women's singles championship at the first US Open (and prize-money of $6,000 - $ today), defeating Billie Jean King in the final. Her second Major tennis singles championship came in 1972 at the Australian Open. There, she defeated Australian Evonne Goolagong in the final 6–4, 6–4. She was appointed a member of the Order of the British Empire (MBE) in the 1973 Birthday Honours for services to lawn tennis.

Wade won Wimbledon in 1977. It was the 16th year in which she had played at Wimbledon, and she made her first appearance in the final by beating the defending champion Chris Evert in the semifinal 6–2, 4–6, 6–1. In the final, she beat Betty Stöve in three sets to claim the championship, nine days before her 32nd birthday. 1977 was the 100th anniversary of the founding of the Wimbledon Championships, as well as the Silver Jubilee year of Elizabeth II, who attended the final for the first time since 1962. 

Wade also won four Major women's doubles championships with Margaret Smith Court – two of them at the U.S. Open Tennis Tournament, one at the Australian Open, and one at the French Open. In 1983, at the age of 37, she won the Italian Open women's doubles championship with Virginia Ruzici of Romania.

Over her career, Wade won 55 professional singles championships and amassed $1,542,278 dollars in career prize money. She was ranked in the world's top 10 continuously from 1967 to 1979. Her career spanned a total of 26 years. She retired from singles competition at the end of the 1985 tennis season, and then from doubles at the end of 1986. The 26 times that she played at Wimbledon is an all-time record, 24 of those times being in the women's singles.

After tennis
Since 1981, while she was still playing, Wade has been a reporter on tennis events for the BBC. In 1982, she became the first woman to be elected to the Wimbledon Committee.

Wade was appointed an Officer of the Order of the British Empire (OBE) in the 1986 Birthday Honours for services to lawn tennis.

In 1989, Wade was inducted into the International Tennis Hall of Fame in Newport, Rhode Island.

Major finals

Grand Slam finals

Singles: 3 (3 titles)

Women's doubles: 10 (4 titles, 6 runner-ups)

Year-end championships finals

Doubles: 2 (1 title, 1 runner–up)

Singles titles (55)
Bold type indicates a Major championship
1967 – Connaught Hard Courts
1968 – US Open, Bloemfontein, Bournemouth, East London, Dewar Cup London
1969 – Cape Town, Hoylake, Dewar Cup Perth, Dewar Cup Stalybridge, Dewar Cup Aberavon, Dewar-Crystal Palace, East London
1970 – German Indoors, West Berlin Open, Irish Open, Stalybridge, Aberavon
1971 – Cape Town, Catania International Open, Rome, Newport-Wales, Cincinnati, Dewar Cup Billingham, Dewar-Aberavon, Dewar Cup Final-London, Clean Air Classic
1972 – Australian Open, VS Indoors-Mass., Merion, Buenos Aires
1973 – Dallas, Bournemouth, Dewar-Aberavon, Dewar Cup Edinburgh, Dewar-Billingham, Dewar Cup Final-Albert Hall
1974 – VS Chicago, Bournemouth, VS Phoenix, Dewar-Edinburgh, Dewar Cup-London
1975 – VS Dallas, VS Philadelphia, Paris Indoors, Eastbourne, Dewar Cup, Stockholm
1976 – U.S. Indoor Championships, Dewar Cup
1977 – Wimbledon, World Invitational Hilton Head, Tokyo Sillook
1978 – Mahwah, Tokyo Sillook, Florida Open
(Source: WTA)

Grand Slam singles performance timeline

Note: The Australian Open was held twice in 1977, in January and December.

Personal life
Wade has no children and has never married. She has said "If I'd done better earlier, and my career had been at its peak earlier and I'd faded, I would probably have had a totally different life." She lives mostly in New York and in Chelsea, London.

See also
 Performance timelines for all female tennis players who reached at least one Grand Slam final

References

External links
 
 
 
 

 
 

1945 births
Alumni of the University of Sussex
Australian Open (tennis) champions
BBC Sports Personality of the Year winners
British expatriates in South Africa
British female tennis players
English female tennis players
English sports broadcasters
English sports coaches
English tennis coaches
French Open champions
Grand Slam (tennis) champions in women's doubles
Grand Slam (tennis) champions in women's singles
International Tennis Hall of Fame inductees
Living people
Officers of the Order of the British Empire
People educated at Talbot Heath School
People educated at Tunbridge Wells Girls' Grammar School
Sportspeople from Bournemouth
Sportspeople from Durban
Tennis commentators
US Open (tennis) champions
Wimbledon champions
World number 1 ranked female tennis players